Volleyball contests at the 2011 European Youth Summer Olympic Festival were held from July 25, 2011 to July 29, 2011. Competitions for boys were played at the Araklı Arena and for the girls at the Arsin Arena in Trabzon, Turkey. Eight nations each for boys and girls took part at the event.

Medal summary

Medal table

Medalist events

Boys

Group round

Group A

Group B

Final round

Semifinal 5–8

Semifinal 1–4

Sevent place match

Fifth place match

Bronze-medal match

Gold-medal match

Girls

Group round

Group A

Group B

Final round

Semi Final 5–8

Semi Final 1–4

Sevent place match

Fifth place match

Bronze-medal match

Gold-medal match

External links
Boys results
Girls results

European Youth Summer Olympic Festival
2011 European Youth Summer Olympic Festival
European Youth Summer Olympic Festival
2011 European Youth Olympics